Juan Pablo Vivas (born 19 January 1994) is an Argentine professional footballer who plays as a midfielder.

Club career
Vivas' senior career got underway with Huracán, following a spell in the club's youth ranks after joining from Boca Juniors; who had signed him from Argentino de Marcos Juárez in 2009. He made his professional debut on 11 July 2017 in the Copa Sudamericana versus Libertad, featuring for the full duration of a 1–5 defeat at the Estadio Tomás Adolfo Ducó; he was also an unused substitute for the return leg weeks later. In August 2018, Vivas joined Primera B Metropolitana side Fénix. He'd appear sixteen times for the club, whilst also netting the first goal of his senior career; versus Almirante Brown on 16 February 2019.

International career
Whilst with Boca Juniors, Vivas was selected to represent the Argentina U20s at the 2012 Cape Town International Challenge.

Career statistics
.

References

External links

1994 births
Living people
Sportspeople from Córdoba Province, Argentina
Argentine footballers
Argentina youth international footballers
Argentina under-20 international footballers
Association football midfielders
Primera B Metropolitana players
Club Atlético Huracán footballers
Club Atlético Fénix players